The masked flying fox, Moluccan masked flying fox or masked fruit bat (Pteropus personatus), is a species of flying fox in the family Pteropodidae. It is endemic to Indonesia. It is part of a species complex of closely related species. The species is hunted.

Distribution and habitat
The masked flying fox is native to the North Molluca Islands in Indonesia.

References

Mammals of Indonesia
Pteropus
Mammals described in 1825
Taxonomy articles created by Polbot
Taxa named by Coenraad Jacob Temminck
Bats of Indonesia